Sharn Wordley (born 8 June 1974) is a New Zealand equestrian. He competed in show jumping at the 2008 Summer Olympics in Beijing.

References

External links
 
 
 

1974 births
Living people
New Zealand male equestrians
Olympic equestrians of New Zealand
Equestrians at the 2008 Summer Olympics